A knee, or river knee, is a bend in a river changing its course greatly, suddenly to a different general direction (in an angle of around 90 degrees). It is different from most (one-off) riverbends, and from a (particular) meander which connotes one of several bends in a sinuous course, without changing the general direction. 

Knees navigable by large vessels or set in upland areas or arid drainage basins were similar to major confluences in that they were particularly suitable for trade and defense, and therefore gave rise to forts, governing army camps or cities.

Many major world rivers have such a notable knee close to major settled places:

 the Rhine knee in Basel, Switzerland is the river's greatest knee – others are in German cities Wiesbaden and Bingen
 the Danube knee in Vác, Hungary (35 km north of Budapest)
 the Volga knee at Volgograd, Russia
 the upper Rhône knee at Martigny, Switzerland
 the Petitcodiac knee at Moncton, New Brunswick, Canada, locally known as Le Coude
 The Irawaddy knee at Mandalay

Some riverbends are in some places referred to "knees" but are bends largely unaffecting the course or a small sharp meander:

 the "Vltava knee" in Prague, Czech Republic
 the "Elbe knee" at Königstein Fortress, Germany
 the "Rhine knee" at Düsseldorf, Germany (see also :de:Rheinkniebrücke)

Limnology
Fluvial landforms
Rivers
Water streams